OtakuKart is an entertainment website focused on publishing news and content about anime, manga, movies, TV shows, and video games from around the world. It was established in April 2015 by Sohel Moldharia.

History 
OtakuKart was originally created as an anime store, however, sometime after, it was converted into an entertainment news blog. It started blogging in November 2015, covering only anime and manga for the first seven months. In 2016, OtakuKart started writing on pop culture and video games.

In May 2021, OtakuKart started working on the "Anime India Initiative", which provided free food to the underprivileged part of society in the wake of the COVID-19 pandemic which left numerous people stranded. The company is also working on planting trees to make a dent in the battle against climate change.

In January 2021, OtakuKart took over Mice News Philippines, a Philippine news website, for an undisclosed amount. In June of that year, OtakuKart acquired Sports Al Dente from LAFB Network, also for an undisclosed amount.

Notable Work 

Shubham Sharma of OtakuKart was behind the "Indian Anime Movement", which was created in April 2019. OtakuKart and Mr. Sharma worked together with a number of YouTubers and influencers to get over 56,299 signatures on the petition to bring Weathering with You, an anime film to India for theatrical release. The creator of the anime movie, Makoto Shinkai, agreed to release the anime film in India when a Change.org petition calling for him to do so received 20,000 signatures.

See also

Otaku
Otaku USA
MyAnimeList
Anime and manga fandom

References

External links
 

Indian companies established in 2015
Anime and manga websites
Video game news websites